The Harms Farm in Phillips County, Colorado near Haxtun, Colorado, also known as Gansemer Farm, is a  farm which was listed on the National Register of Historic Places in 2016.

The farmland was claimed by John A. Nelson under the Timber Culture Act in 1894.  It was purchased by William Gansemer in 1917 and it has been in continuous operation since.  William eventually sold to his brother Fred.  In 2015 it was operated by Duane Harms, Fred Gansemer's great-grandson.

References

Historic farms in the United States
1917 establishments in Colorado
Farms on the National Register of Historic Places in Colorado
National Register of Historic Places in Phillips County, Colorado
Century farms
Historic districts on the National Register of Historic Places in Colorado